

Events

Pre-1600
AD 69 – Vespasian is proclaimed Emperor of Rome; his predecessor, Vitellius, attempts to abdicate but is captured and killed at the Gemonian stairs.
 401 – Pope Innocent I is elected, the only pope to succeed his father in the office.
 856 – Damghan earthquake: An earthquake near the Persian city of Damghan kills an estimated 200,000 people, the sixth deadliest earthquake in recorded history.
 880 – Luoyang, eastern capital of the Tang dynasty, is captured by rebel leader Huang Chao during the reign of Emperor Xizong.
1135 – Three weeks after the death of King Henry I of England, Stephen of Blois claims the throne and is privately crowned King of England, beginning the English Anarchy.
1216 – Pope Honorius III approves the Dominican Order through the papal bull of confirmation Religiosam vitam.
1489 – The forces of the Catholic Monarchs, Ferdinand and Isabella, take control of Almería from the Nasrid ruler of Granada, Muhammad XIII.

1601–1900
1769 – Sino-Burmese War: The war ends with the Qing dynasty withdrawing from Burma forever.
1788 – Nguyễn Huệ proclaims himself Emperor Quang Trung, in effect abolishing on his own the Lê dynasty.
1790 – The Turkish fortress of Izmail is stormed and captured by Alexander Suvorov and his Russian armies.
1807 – The Embargo Act, forbidding trade with all foreign countries, is passed by the U.S. Congress at the urging of President Thomas Jefferson.
1808 – Ludwig van Beethoven conducts and performs in concert at the Theater an der Wien, Vienna, with the premiere of his Fifth Symphony, Sixth Symphony, Fourth Piano Concerto and Choral Fantasy.
1851 – India's first freight train is operated in Roorkee, to transport material for the construction of the Ganges Canal.
1851 – The Library of Congress in Washington, D.C., burns.
1864 – American Civil War: Savannah, Georgia, falls to the Union's Army of the Tennessee, and General Sherman tells President Abraham Lincoln: "I beg to present you as a Christmas gift the city of Savannah".
1885 – Itō Hirobumi, a samurai, becomes the first Prime Minister of Japan.
1888 – The Christmas Meeting of 1888, considered to be the official start of the Faroese independence movement.
1890 – Cornwallis Valley Railway begins operation between Kentville and Kingsport, Nova Scotia.
1891 – Asteroid 323 Brucia becomes the first asteroid discovered using photography.
1894 – The Dreyfus affair begins in France, when Alfred Dreyfus is wrongly convicted of treason.

1901–present
1906 – An  7.9 earthquake strikes Xinjiang, China, killing at least 280.
1920 – The GOELRO economic development plan is adopted by the 8th Congress of Soviets of the Russian SFSR.
1921 – Opening of Visva-Bharati College, also known as Santiniketan College, now Visva Bharati University, India.
1937 – The Lincoln Tunnel opens to traffic in New York City.
1939 – Indian Muslims observe a "Day of Deliverance" to celebrate the resignations of members of the Indian National Congress over their not having been consulted over the decision to enter World War II with the United Kingdom.
1940 – World War II: Himara is captured by the Greek army.
1942 – World War II: Adolf Hitler signs the order to develop the V-2 rocket as a weapon.
1944 – World War II: Battle of the Bulge: German troops demand the surrender of United States troops at Bastogne, Belgium, prompting the famous one word reply by General Anthony McAuliffe: "Nuts!"
  1944   – World War II: The People's Army of Vietnam is formed to resist Japanese occupation of Indochina, now Vietnam.
1945 – U.S. President Harry S. Truman issues an executive order giving World War II refugees precedence in visa applications under U.S. immigration quotas.
1948 – Sjafruddin Prawiranegara established the Emergency Government of the Republic of Indonesia (Pemerintah Darurat Republik Indonesia, PDRI) in West Sumatra.
1964 – The first test flight of the SR-71 (Blackbird) takes place at Air Force Plant 42 in Palmdale, California, United States.
1965 – In the United Kingdom, a  speed limit is applied to all rural roads including motorways for the first time.
1968 – Cultural Revolution: People's Daily posted the instructions of Mao Zedong that "The intellectual youth must go to the country, and will be educated from living in rural poverty."
1971 – The international aid organization Doctors Without Borders is founded by Bernard Kouchner and a group of journalists in Paris, France.
1973 – A Royal Air Maroc Sud Aviation Caravelle crashes near Tanger-Boukhalef Airport (now Tangier Ibn Battouta Airport) in Tangier, Morocco, killing 106.
1974 – Grande Comore, Anjouan and Mohéli vote to become the independent nation of Comoros. Mayotte remains under French administration.
  1974   – The house of former British Prime Minister Edward Heath is attacked by members of the Provisional IRA.
1975 – U.S. President Gerald Ford creates the Strategic Petroleum Reserve in response to the 1970s energy crisis. 
1978 – The pivotal Third Plenum of the 11th National Congress of the Chinese Communist Party is held in Beijing, with Deng Xiaoping reversing Mao-era policies to pursue a program for Chinese economic reform.
1984 – "Subway vigilante" Bernhard Goetz shoots four would-be muggers on a 2 express train in Manhattan section of New York, United States.
1987 – In Zimbabwe, the political parties ZANU and ZAPU reach an agreement that ends the violence in the Matabeleland region known as the Gukurahundi.
1989 – Romanian Revolution: Communist President of Romania Nicolae Ceaușescu is overthrown by Ion Iliescu after days of bloody confrontations. The deposed dictator and his wife Elena flee Bucharest in a helicopter as protesters erupt in cheers.
  1989   – German reunification: Berlin's Brandenburg Gate re-opens after nearly 30 years, effectively ending the division of East and West Germany.
1990 – Lech Wałęsa is elected President of Poland.
  1990   – Final independence of Marshall Islands and Federated States of Micronesia after termination of trusteeship.
1992 – During approach to Tripoli International Airport, a Boeing 727 operating as Libyan Arab Airlines Flight 1103 collides in mid-air with a Libyan Air Force Mikoyan-Gurevich MiG-23, killing 157 people.
1996 – Airborne Express Flight 827 crashes near Narrows, Virginia, killing all six people on board.
1997 – Acteal massacre: Attendees at a prayer meeting of Roman Catholic activists for indigenous causes in the small village of Acteal in the Mexican state of Chiapas are massacred by paramilitary forces.
  1997   – Somali Civil War: Hussein Farrah Aidid relinquishes the disputed title of President of Somalia by signing the Cairo Declaration, in Cairo, Egypt. It is the first major step towards reconciliation in Somalia since 1991.
1999 – Just after taking off from London Stansted Airport, Korean Air Cargo Flight 8509 crashes into Hatfield Forest near Great Hallingbury, killing all four people on board.
2001 – Burhanuddin Rabbani, political leader of the Northern Alliance, hands over power in Islamic State of Afghanistan to the interim government headed by President Hamid Karzai.
  2001   – Richard Reid attempts to destroy a passenger airliner by igniting explosives hidden in his shoes aboard American Airlines Flight 63.
2008 – An ash dike ruptured at a solid waste containment area in Roane County, Tennessee, releasing  of coal fly ash slurry.
2010 – The repeal of the Don't ask, don't tell policy, the 17-year-old policy banning homosexuals serving openly in the United States military, is signed into law by President Barack Obama.
2012 – Bashir Ahmad Bilour of Awami National Party and eight others are killed in a Pakistan Taliban bomber suicide attack in Dhaki Nalbandi area near Qissa Khwani Bazaar.
2016 – A study finds the VSV-EBOV vaccine against the Ebola virus between 70 and 100% effective, thus making it the first proven vaccine against the disease.
2017 – United Nations Security Council Resolution 2397 against North Korea is unanimously approved.
  2017   – President Donald Trump signs the Tax Cuts and Jobs Act of 2017.
2018 – A tsunami caused by an eruption of Anak Krakatau in Indonesia kills at least 430 people and injures almost a thousand more.
  2018   – The 2018–2019 United States federal government shutdown, the longest shutdown of the U.S. federal government in history, begins.

Births

Pre-1600
 244 – Diocletian, Roman emperor (d. 311)
 948 – Gang Gam-chan, Korean official and general (d. 1031)
1095 – Roger II of Sicily (d. 1154)
1178 – Emperor Antoku of Japan (d. 1185)
1183 – Chagatai Khan, Mongol ruler (d. 1242)
1300 – Khutughtu Khan Kusala, Mongolian emperor (d. 1329)
1459 – Sultan Cem, Ottoman politician (d. 1495)
1546 – Kuroda Yoshitaka, Japanese daimyō (d. 1604)
1550 – Cesare Cremonini, Italian philosopher and author (d. 1631)
1569 – Étienne Martellange, French architect (d. 1641)
1591 – Tommaso Dingli, Maltese architect and sculptor (d. 1666)

1601–1900
1639 – Jean Racine, French poet and playwright (d. 1699)
1666 – Guru Gobind Singh, Indian guru and poet (d. 1708)
1694 – Hermann Samuel Reimarus, German philosopher and academic (d. 1768)
1696 – James Oglethorpe, English general and politician, 1st Colonial Governor of Georgia (d. 1785)
1723 – Carl Friedrich Abel, German viol player and composer (d. 1787)
1765 – Johann Friedrich Pfaff, German mathematician and academic (d. 1825)
1799 – Nicholas Callan, Irish priest and physicist (d. 1864)
1805 – John Obadiah Westwood, English entomologist and archaeologist (d. 1893)
1807 – Johan Sebastian Welhaven, Norwegian author, poet, and critic (d. 1873)
1819 – Franz Abt, German composer and conductor (d. 1870)
  1819   – Pierre Ossian Bonnet, French mathematician and academic (d. 1892)
1839 – John Nevil Maskelyne, English magician (d. 1917)
1850 – Victoriano Huerta, Mexican general and politician, 35th President of Mexico (d. 1916)
1853 – Teresa Carreño, Venezuelan-American singer-songwriter and pianist (d. 1917)
  1853   – Evgraf Fedorov, Russian mathematician, crystallographer, and mineralogist (d. 1919)
  1853   – Sarada Devi, Indian mystic and philosopher (d. 1920)
1856 – Frank B. Kellogg, American lawyer and politician, 45th United States Secretary of State, Nobel Prize laureate (d. 1937)
1858 – Giacomo Puccini, Italian composer and educator (d. 1924)
1862 – Connie Mack, American baseball player and manager (d. 1956)
1865 – Charles Sands, American golfer and tennis player (d. 1945)
1868 – Jaan Tõnisson, Estonian journalist, lawyer, and politician, 2nd Prime Minister of Estonia (d. 1941?)
1869 – Dmitri Egorov, Russian mathematician and academic (d. 1931)
  1869   – Edwin Arlington Robinson, American poet and playwright (d. 1935)
1872 – Camille Guérin, French veterinarian and bacteriologist (d. 1961)
1874 – Franz Schmidt, Austrian cellist, pianist, and composer (d. 1939)
1876 – Filippo Tommaso Marinetti, Egyptian-Italian poet and composer (d. 1944)
1878 – Myer Prinstein, Polish-American jumper (d. 1925)
1883 – Marcus Hurley, American cyclist (d. 1941)
  1883   – Edgard Varèse, French-American composer (d. 1965)
1884 – St. Elmo Brady, African American chemist and educator (d. 1966)
1885 – Deems Taylor, American conductor and critic (d. 1966)
1887 – Srinivasa Ramanujan, Indian mathematician and theorist (d. 1920)
1888 – J. Arthur Rank, 1st Baron Rank, English businessman, founded Rank Organisation (d. 1972)
1889 – George Hutson, English runner and soldier (d. 1914)
1892 – Herman Potočnik, Slovenian-Austrian engineer (d. 1929)
1894 – Edwin Linkomies, Finnish academic, professor and the Prime Minister of Finland (d. 1963)
1898 – Vladimir Fock, Russian physicist and mathematician (d. 1974)
1899 – Gustaf Gründgens, German actor and director (d. 1963)
1900 – Marc Allégret, French director and screenwriter (d. 1973)

1901–present
1901 – Andre Kostelanetz, Russian-American conductor and composer (d. 1980)
1903 – Haldan Keffer Hartline, American physiologist and academic, Nobel Prize laureate (d. 1983)
1905 – Pierre Brasseur, French-Italian actor and screenwriter (d. 1972)
  1905   – Pierre Levegh, French ice hockey player and racing driver (d. 1955)
  1905   – Kenneth Rexroth, American poet, translator, and academic (d. 1982)
1907 – Peggy Ashcroft, English actress (d. 1991)
1908 – Giacomo Manzù, Italian sculptor and academic (d. 1991)
1909 – Patricia Hayes, English actress (d. 1998)
1911 – Danny O'Dea, English actor (d. 2003)
1912 – Elias Degiannis, Greek commander (d. 1943)
  1912   – Lady Bird Johnson, American beautification activist;  38th First Lady of the United States (d. 2007)
1913 – Giorgio Oberweger, Italian discus thrower and hurdler (d. 1998)
1915 – Barbara Billingsley, American actress (d. 2010)
  1915   – Phillip Glasier, English author and academic (d. 2000)
1917 – Gene Rayburn, American game show host and actor (d. 1999)
1921 – Dimitri Fampas, Greek guitarist and composer (d. 1996)
  1921   – Hawkshaw Hawkins, American singer-songwriter and guitarist (d. 1963)
1922 – Ruth Roman, American actress (d. 1999)
  1922   – Jim Wright, American soldier, lawyer, and politician, 56th Speaker of the United States House of Representatives (d. 2015)
1923 – Peregrine Worsthorne, English journalist and author (d. 2020)
1924 – Frank Corsaro, American actor and director (d. 2017)
1925 – Lewis Glucksman, American businessman and philanthropist (d. 2006)
  1925   – Lefter Küçükandonyadis, Turkish footballer and manager (d. 2012)
1926 – Alcides Ghiggia, Italian-Uruguayan footballer and manager (d. 2015)
  1926   – Roberta Leigh (Rita Shulman Lewin), British writer, artist and TV producer (d. 2014)
1928 – Fredrik Barth, German-Norwegian anthropologist and academic (d. 2016)
1929 – Wazir Mohammad, Indian-Pakistani cricketer
1930 – Ardalion Ignatyev, Russian sprinter and educator (d. 1998)
1931 – Gisela Birkemeyer, German hurdler and coach
  1931   – Carlos Graça, São Toméan lawyer and politician, Prime Minister of São Tomé and Príncipe (d. 2013)
1932 – Phil Woosnam, Welsh soccer player and manager (d. 2013)
1933 – John Hartle, English motorcycle racer (d. 1968)
1934 – David Pearson, American race car driver (d. 2018)
1935 – Paulo Rocha, Portuguese director and screenwriter (d. 2012)
1936 – James Burke, Irish historian and author
  1936   – Héctor Elizondo, American actor and director
1937 – Charlotte Lamb, English author (d. 2000)
  1937   – Eduard Uspensky, Russian author, poet, and playwright (d. 2018)
  1937   – Ken Whitmore, English author and playwright
1938 – Matty Alou, Dominican-American baseball player and scout (d. 2011)
  1938   – Lucien Bouchard, Canadian lawyer and politician, 27th Premier of Quebec
  1938   – Red Steagall, American singer-songwriter, guitarist, actor, and poet
1940 – Luis Francisco Cuéllar, Colombian rancher and politician (d. 2009)
  1940   – Mike Molloy, English journalist, author, and illustrator
1942 – Jerry Koosman, American baseball player
  1942   – Dick Parry, English saxophonist
1943 – Stefan Janos, Slovak-Swiss physicist and academic
  1943   – Paul Wolfowitz, American banker and politician, 25th United States Deputy Secretary of Defense
1944 – Mary Archer, English chemist and academic
  1944   – Steve Carlton, American baseball player
  1944   – Barry Jenkins, English drummer
1945 – Frances Lannon, English historian and academic
  1945   – Sam Newman, Australian footballer and sportscaster
  1945   – Diane Sawyer, American journalist
1946 – Roger Carr, English businessman
  1946   – C. Eugene Steuerle, American economist and author
1947 – Brian Daley, American author and screenwriter (d. 1996)
  1947   – Dilip Doshi, Indian cricketer
1948 – Steve Garvey, American baseball player and sportscaster
  1948   – Don Kardong, American runner, journalist, and author
  1948   – Rick Nielsen, American singer-songwriter and guitarist
  1948   – Chris Old, English cricketer and coach
  1948   – Lynne Thigpen, American actress and singer (d. 2003)
1949 – Maurice Gibb, Manx-English singer-songwriter and producer (d. 2003)
  1949   – Robin Gibb, Manx-English singer-songwriter and producer (d. 2012)
  1949   – Ray Guy, American football player (d. 2022)
1951 – Lasse Bengtsson, Swedish journalist
  1951   – Charles de Lint, Dutch-Canadian author and critic
  1951   – Gerald Grosvenor, 6th Duke of Westminster, British landowner, businessman and philanthropist (d. 2016)
  1951  – Tony Isabella, American comic book writer, editor, actor, artist and critic
  1951   – Jan Stephenson, Australian golfer
1952 – Sandra Kalniete, Latvian politician and diplomat, Latvian Minister of Foreign Affairs
1953 – Ian Turnbull, Canadian ice hockey player
  1953   – Tom Underwood, American baseball player (d. 2010)
1954 – Hideshi Matsuda, Japanese racing driver
  1954   – Derick Parry, Nevisian cricketer
1955 – Galina Murašova, Lithuanian discus thrower
  1955   – Lonnie Smith, American baseball player
  1955   – Thomas C. Südhof, German-American biochemist and academic, Nobel Prize laureate
1956 – Jane Lighting, English businesswoman
1957 – Stephen Conway, English bishop
  1957   – Carole James, English-Canadian educator and politician
  1957   – Peter Mortimer, Australian rugby league player
1958 – Frank Gambale, Australian guitarist, songwriter, and producer
  1958   – David Heavener, American singer-songwriter, producer, actor, and director
1959 – Bernd Schuster, German footballer and manager
1960 – Jean-Michel Basquiat, American painter and poet (d. 1988)
  1960   – Luther Campbell, American rapper and actor
1961 – Yuri Malenchenko, Russian colonel, pilot, and astronaut
1962 – Ralph Fiennes, English actor
1963 – Giuseppe Bergomi, Italian footballer and coach
  1963   – Brian McMillan, South African cricketer and educator
  1963   – Luna H. Mitani, Japanese-American painter and illustrator
1964 – Simon Kirby, English businessman and politician
  1964   – Mike Jackson, American baseball player
  1965   – David S. Goyer, American screenwriter
1965 – Urszula Włodarczyk, Polish heptathlete and triple jumper
1966 – Dmitry Bilozerchev, Russian gymnast and coach
  1966   – Marcel Schirmer, German singer-songwriter and bass player
  1966   – David Wright, English lawyer and politician
1967 – Richey Edwards, Welsh singer-songwriter and guitarist (d. 1995)
  1967   – Stéphane Gendron, Canadian lawyer and politician
  1967   – Rebecca Harris, English businesswoman and politician
  1967   – Dan Petrescu, Romanian footballer and manager
1968 – Emre Aracı, Turkish composer, conductor, and historian
  1968   – Luis Hernández, Mexican footballer
  1968   – Dina Meyer, American actress
1969 – Myriam Bédard, Canadian biathlete
  1969   – Mark Robins, English footballer and manager
1970 – Ted Cruz, American lawyer and politician
  1970   – Gary Anderson, Scottish darts player
1971 – Ajeenkya Patil, Indian economist and academic
1972 – Kirk Maltby, Canadian ice hockey player and scout
  1972   – Vanessa Paradis, French singer-songwriter and actress
  1972   – Mark Hill, English musician, producer and songwriter
1975 – Sergei Aschwanden, Swiss martial artist
  1975   – Dmitri Khokhlov, Russian footballer and manager
  1975   – Marcin Mięciel, Polish footballer
  1975   – Stanislav Neckář, Czech ice hockey player
  1975   – Takuya Onishi, Japanese astronaut
1976 – Katleen De Caluwé, Belgian sprinter
  1976   – Jason Lane, American baseball player and coach
  1976   – Aya Takano, Japanese author and illustrator
1977 – Steve Kariya, Canadian ice hockey player and coach
1978 – Danny Ahn, South Korean singer
  1978   – Joy Ali, Fijian boxer (d. 2015)
  1978   – Emmanuel Olisadebe, Nigerian-Polish footballer
1979 – Jamie Langfield, Scottish footballer and coach
1981 – Marina Kuptsova, Russian high jumper
1982 – Britta Heidemann, German fencer
  1982   – Alinne Moraes, Brazilian actress and model
1983 – Ryan Eversley, American race car driver
  1983   – Drew Hankinson, American wrestler
  1983   – Viola Kibiwot, Kenyan runner
  1983   – José Fonte, Portuguese footballer
1984 – Basshunter, Swedish singer, record producer and DJ
1986 – Dennis Armfield, Australian footballer
  1986   – Fatih Öztürk, Turkish footballer
1987 – Éder, Bissau-Portuguese footballer
1988 – Leigh Halfpenny, Welsh rugby player
1989 – Jordin Sparks, American singer-songwriter and actress
1990 – Jean-Baptiste Maunier, French actor and singer
1991 – DaBaby, American rapper
1992 – Michaela Hončová, Slovak tennis player
  1992   – Moonbyul, Korean rapper, vocalist and songwriter
1993 – Meghan Trainor, American singer-songwriter and producer
  1993   – Raphaël Guerreiro, Portuguese footballer
1994 – Rúben Lameiras, Portuguese footballer
1998 – G Hannelius, American actress and singer
  1998   – Casper Ruud, Norwegian tennis player
2000 – Joshua Bassett, American actor and singer
2001 – Camila Osorio, Colombian tennis player

Deaths

Pre-1600
AD 69 – Vitellius, Roman emperor (b. 15)
 731 – Yuan Qianyao, official of the Chinese Tang Dynasty
1012 – Baha' al-Dawla, Buyid amir of Iraq
1060 – Cynesige, Archbishop of York
1100 – Bretislav II of Bohemia (b. 1060)
1115 – Olaf Magnusson, King of Norway (b. 1099)
1419 – Antipope John XXIII
1530 – Willibald Pirckheimer, German lawyer and author (b. 1470)
1554 – Alessandro Bonvicino, Italian painter (b. 1498)
1572 – François Clouet, French miniaturist (b. c. 1510)

1601–1900
1603 – Mehmed III, Ottoman sultan (b. 1566)
1641 – Maximilien de Béthune, Duke of Sully, 2nd Prime Minister of France (b. 1560)
1646 – Petro Mohyla, Ruthenian metropolitan and saint (b. 1596)
1660 – André Tacquet, Flemish priest and mathematician (b. 1612)
1666 – Guercino, Italian painter (b. 1591)
1681 – Richard Alleine, English minister and author (b. 1611)
1767 – John Newbery, English publisher (b. 1713)
1788 – Percivall Pott, English physician and surgeon (b. 1714)
1806 – William Vernon, English-American merchant (b. 1719)
1828 – William Hyde Wollaston, English chemist and physicist (b. 1766)
1853 – Manuel María Lombardini, Mexican general and politician. President (1853) (b. 1802)
1867 – Jean-Victor Poncelet, French mathematician and engineer (b. 1788)
1870 – Gustavo Adolfo Bécquer, Spanish journalist, poet, and playwright (b. 1836)
1880 – George Eliot, English novelist and poet (b. 1819)
1891 – Paul de Lagarde, German biblical scholar and orientalist (b. 1827)
1899 – Dwight L. Moody, American evangelist and publisher, founded Moody Publishers (b. 1837)

1901–present
1902 – Richard von Krafft-Ebing, German-Austrian psychiatrist and author (b. 1840)
1915 – Rose Talbot Bullard, American medical doctor and professor (b. 1864)
1917 – Frances Xavier Cabrini, Italian-American nun and saint (b. 1850)
1918 – Aristeidis Moraitinis, Greek lieutenant and pilot (b. 1891)
1919 – Hermann Weingärtner, German gymnast (b. 1864)
1925 – Amelie Beese, German pilot and engineer (b. 1886)
1939 – Ma Rainey, American singer (b. 1886)
1940 – Nathanael West, American author and screenwriter (b. 1903)
1941 – Karel Hašler, Czech actor, director, composer, and screenwriter (b. 1879)
1942 – Franz Boas, German-American anthropologist and linguist (b. 1858)
1943 – Beatrix Potter, English children's book writer and illustrator (b. 1866)
1944 – Harry Langdon, American actor, comedian, and vaudevillian (b. 1884)
1950 – Frederick Freake, English polo player (b. 1876)
1957 – Frank George Woollard, English engineer (b. 1883)
1959 – Gilda Gray, Polish-American actress and dancer (b. 1901)
1960 – Ninian Comper, Scottish-English architect (b. 1864)
1962 – Ross McLarty, Australian politician, 17th Premier of Western Australia (b. 1891)
1965 – Richard Dimbleby, English journalist (b. 1913)
1968 – Raymond Gram Swing, American journalist (b. 1887)
1969 – Enrique Peñaranda, 45th President of Bolivia (b. 1892)
1971 – Godfried Bomans, Dutch journalist and author (b. 1913)
1974 – Sterling North, American author and critic (b. 1906)
1979 – Darryl F. Zanuck, American director and producer (b. 1902)
1985 – D. Boon, American singer and musician (b. 1958)
1986 – Mary Burchell, English author and activist (b. 1904)
  1986   – David Penhaligon, Cornish Liberal Politician (b. 1944), Member of Parliament (MP) for Truro (1974-1986)
1987 – Luca Prodan, Italian-Scottish singer-songwriter and guitarist (b. 1953)
1988 – Chico Mendes, Brazilian trade union leader and activist (b. 1944)
1989 – Samuel Beckett, Irish author, poet, and playwright, Nobel Prize laureate (b. 1906)
1992 – Harry Bluestone, English violinist and composer (b. 1907)
  1992   – Frederick William Franz, American religious leader (b. 1893)
1993 – Don DeFore, American actor (b. 1913)
1995 – Butterfly McQueen, American actress and dancer (b. 1911)
  1995   – James Meade, English economist and academic, Nobel Prize laureate (b. 1907)
1996 – Jack Hamm, American cartoonist and television host (b. 1916)
1997 – Sebastian Arcos Bergnes, Cuban-American dentist and activist (b. 1931)
2001 – Ovidiu Iacov, Romanian footballer (b. 1981)
  2001   – Walter Newton Read, American lawyer and second chairman of the New Jersey Casino Control Commission (b. 1918)
2002 – Desmond Hoyte, Guyanese lawyer, politician and President of Guyana (b. 1929)
  2002   – Joe Strummer, English singer-songwriter (b. 1952)
2004 – Doug Ault, American baseball player and manager (b. 1950)
2006 – Elena Mukhina, Russian gymnast (b. 1960)
  2006   – Galina Ustvolskaya, Russian composer (b. 1919)
2007 – Charles Court, Australian politician, 21st Premier of Western Australia (b. 1911)
  2007   – Adrian Cristobal, Filipino journalist and playwright (b. 1932)
2009 – Luis Francisco Cuéllar, Colombian rancher and politician (b. 1940)
  2009   – Albert Scanlon, English footballer (b. 1935)
2010 – Fred Foy, American soldier and announcer (b. 1921)
2012 – Chuck Cherundolo, American football player and coach (b. 1916)
  2012   – Ryan Freel, American baseball player (b. 1976)
  2012   – Cliff Osmond, American actor, director, producer, and screenwriter (b. 1937)
  2012   – Lim Keng Yaik, Malaysian physician and politician (b. 1939)
2013 – Diomedes Díaz, Colombian singer-songwriter (b. 1956)
  2013   – Hans Hækkerup, Danish lawyer and politician (b. 1945)
  2013   – Oscar Peer, Swiss author, playwright, and philologist (b. 1928)
2014 – John Robert Beyster, American physicist and academic (b. 1924)
  2014   – Christine Cavanaugh, American actress (b. 1963)
  2014   – Joe Cocker, English singer-songwriter (b. 1944)
  2014   – Bernard Stone, American lawyer and politician (b. 1927)
2015 – Peter Lundblad, Swedish singer-songwriter (b. 1950)
  2015   – Freda Meissner-Blau, Australian activist and politician (b. 1927)
2016 – Chad Robinson, Australian rugby league player (b. 1980)
2017 – Gonzalo Morales Sáurez, Costa Rican painter (b. 1945)
2018 – Paddy Ashdown, British politician (b. 1941)
  2018   – Simcha Rotem, last survivor of the Warsaw Ghetto Uprising (b. 1924)
  2018   – Herman Sikumbang, Indonesian guitarist (b. 1982); casualty during 2018 Sunda Strait tsunami
2019 – Ram Dass, American spiritual teacher and author (b. 1931)

Holidays and observances
Dongzhi Festival
Armed Forces Day (Vietnam)
Christian feast day:
Anastasia of Sirmium (Orthodox Church)
Eimhin
Ernan, Son of Eogan
Frances Xavier Cabrini (outside US)
Hunger
O Rex
Henry Budd (Episcopal Church (USA))
Lottie Moon (Episcopal Church (USA))
December 22 (Eastern Orthodox liturgics)
Mother's Day (Indonesia)
National Mathematics Day (India)
Teachers' Day (Cuba)
Unity Day (Zimbabwe)

References

External links

BBC: On This Day

Historical Events on December 22

Days of the year
December